Julien Nicolardot (born 13 December 1981) is a French swimmer, who specialized in breaststroke events. He is a member of Mulhouse Olympic Natation in Mulhouse, and is coached and trained by Lionel Horter.

Nicolardot competed as a lone French swimmer in the men's 200 m breaststroke at the 2008 Summer Olympics in Beijing. He fired off a scintillating 2:13.36 to immediately punch his ticket to Beijing at the French Championships in Dunkirk, bettering the insurmountable FINA A-standard (2:13.70) by more than a third (0.33) of a second. Swimming on the outside in heat four, Nicolardot headed into the final lap with Austria's Hunor Mate and Kazakhstan's Yevgeniy Ryzhkov racing against each other in a sprint finish for the top three spot, but faded nearly to fifth with a steady 2:12.44, nearly a second faster than his entry time. Nicolardot failed to advance to the semifinals, as he placed twenty-eighth overall out of fifty-three swimmers in the prelims.

References

External links
NBC Olympics Profile

1981 births
Living people
Olympic swimmers of France
Swimmers at the 2008 Summer Olympics
French male breaststroke swimmers
Sportspeople from Dijon
20th-century French people
21st-century French people